Colm O'Callaghan (born 1999) is an Irish Gaelic footballer who plays for Cork Senior Championship club Éire Óg and at inter-county level with the Cork senior football team. He usually lines out as a centre-forward.

Honours

Cork
National Football League Division 3 (1): 2020
All-Ireland Under-20 Football Championship (1): 2019
Munster Under-20 Football Championship (1): 2019

References

1999 births
Living people
Éire Óg (Cork) Gaelic footballers
Cork inter-county Gaelic footballers